The 1979 Soviet Cup was an association football cup competition of the Soviet Union. The winner of the competition, Dinamo Tbilisi qualified for the continental tournament.

Competition schedule

Group stage
Games took place between February 28 – March 14, 1979.

Group 1
 [Tbilisi, Rustavi]
 1.Dinamo Tbilisi            5   5  0  0  14- 2  10  Qualified 
 --------------------------------------------------
 2.Torpedo Kutaisi           5   4  0  1   7- 5   8 
 3.SKA Rostov-na-Donu        5   3  0  2   9- 8   6 
 4.UralMash Sverdlovsk       5   2  0  3   4- 4   4 
 5.Dinamo Leningrad          5   0  1  4   2- 6   1 
 6.Zarya Voroshilovgrad      5   0  1  4   5-16   1

Group 2
 [Leselidze, Eshera, Kudepsta]
 1.Dinamo Kiev               5   3  2  0   7- 1   8  Qualified 
 --------------------------------------------------
 2.Iskra Smolensk            5   3  0  2   5- 4   6 
 3.Dinamo Minsk              5   2  1  2   6- 3   5 
 4.Spartak Orjonikidze       5   2  1  2   4- 3   5 
 5.Zenit Leningrad           5   2  1  2   2- 5   5 
 6.Nistru Kishinev           5   0  1  4   0- 8   1

Group 3
 [Dushanbe, Kurgan-Tyube, Nurek]
 1.Pamir Dushanbe            5   5  0  0  10- 2  10  Qualified 
 --------------------------------------------------
 2.Dnepr Dnepropetrovsk      5   3  1  1  10- 4   7 
 3.Pahtakor Tashkent         5   2  2  1   4- 2   6 
 4.Shakhtyor Donetsk         5   2  1  2   5- 5   5 
 5.Alga Frunze               5   0  1  4   0- 7   1 
 6.Traktor Pavlodar          5   0  1  4   1-10   1

Group 4
 [Chimkent]
 1.Dinamo Moskva             5   5  0  0  11- 0  10  Qualified 
 --------------------------------------------------
 2.Kayrat Alma-Ata           5   3  0  2  11- 5   6 
 3.Shinnik Yaroslavl         5   3  0  2   8- 7   6 
 4.Metallist Kharkov         5   1  1  3   3- 4   3 
 5.Avtomobilist Termez       5   1  1  3   3-12   3 
 6.Kolhozchi Ashkhabad       5   0  2  3   1- 9   2

Group 5
 [Sochi, Adler]
 1.Spartak Moskva            5   4  1  0   8- 2   9  Qualified 
 --------------------------------------------------
 2.Neftchi Baku              5   4  0  1   7- 3   8 
 3.Zvezda Perm               5   2  0  3   6- 6   4 
 4.SKA Odessa                5   2  0  3   3- 5   4 
 5.Terek Grozny              5   1  1  3   4- 7   3 
 6.Mashuk Pyatigorsk         5   1  0  4   2- 7   2

Group 6
 [Adler, Hosta]
 1.CSKA Moskva               5   4  1  0   9- 0   9  Qualified 
 --------------------------------------------------
 2.Lokomotiv Moskva          5   3  1  1   7- 1   7 
 3.Kuban Krasnodar           5   1  3  1   3- 2   5 
 4.Guria Lanchkhuti          5   1  2  2   3- 6   4 
 5.Metallurg Zaporozhye      5   1  1  3   2- 6   3 
 6.Spartak Nalchik           5   0  2  3   2-11   2

Group 7
 [Yerevan]
 1.Karpaty Lvov              5   4  1  0   8- 3   9  Qualified 
 --------------------------------------------------
 2.Chernomorets Odessa       5   3  2  0   5- 2   8 
 3.Ararat Yerevan            5   3  0  2   6- 2   6 
 4.Kolos Nikopol             5   1  1  3   4- 5   3 
 5.Spartak Ivano-Frankovsk   5   1  1  3   3- 6   3 
 6.Žalgiris Vilnius          5   0  1  4   2-10   1

Group 8
 [Simferopol, Yevpatoria]
 1.Krylya Sovetov Kuibyshev  5   3  1  1   6- 4   7  Qualified 
 --------------------------------------------------
 2.Tavria Simferopol         5   3  1  1   7- 4   7 
 3.Torpedo Moskva            5   2  1  2   4- 3   5 
 4.Fakel Voronezh            5   2  0  3   6- 6   4 
 5.Shakhtyor Karaganda       5   2  0  3   5- 9   4 
 6.Kuzbass Kemerovo          5   1  1  3   3- 5   3

Play-off stage

Quarterfinals
 [Mar 20] 
 Dinamo Kiev             0-1  CSKA Moskva               [in Mukachevo] 
   [Alexandr Kolpovskiy 28. Att: 25,000] 
 DINAMO Moskva           3-0  Spartak Moskva            [in Chimkent] 
   [Nikolai Latysh 33, Alexei Petrushin 57, Alexandr Maksimenkov 63. Att: 25,000] 
 DINAMO Tbilisi          2-0  Krylya Sovetov Kuibyshev  
   [Vakhtang Koridze 10, Manuchar Machaidze 57. Att: 50,000] 
 KARPATY Lvov            3-1  Pamir Dushanbe 
   [Stepan Yurchishin 14, 31, 43 - Viktor Raimjanov 90. Att: 45,000]

Semifinals
 [Jun 9] 
 CSKA Moskva             1-2  DINAMO Tbilisi      [aet] 
   [Alexandr Chivadze (D) 23 og – Vitaliy Daraselia 73, David Kipiani 92] 
 [Jun 10] 
 DINAMO Moskva           2-1  Karpaty Lvov        [aet] 
   [Valeriy Gazzayev 17, Alexandr Minayev 108 – Yuriy Bondarenko 88 pen. Att: 17,000]

Final

External links
 Complete calendar. helmsoccer.narod.ru
 1979 Soviet Cup. Footballfacts.ru
 1979 Soviet football season. RSSSF

Soviet Cup seasons
Cup
Soviet Cup
Soviet Cup